XHOEX-FM is a noncommercial, social community radio station in Texcoco, State of Mexico, Mexico. Broadcasting on 89.3 FM, XHOEX is owned by Omega Experimental, A.C. and is known as La Uni-K.

History
XHOEX received its permit on August 9, 2005. It was among the first new community radio stations permitted in Mexico in decades. It originally operated on 100.5 MHz before being approved to move to 89.3 in 2010.

References

2005 establishments in Mexico
Community radio stations in Mexico
Radio stations in the State of Mexico
Radio stations established in 2005
Regional Mexican radio stations